Christianity Magazine was a magazine produced by certain preachers within the non-institutional Churches of Christ. The magazine was published on a monthly basis. Its editors were Dee Bowman, Paul Earnhart, Ed Harrell, Sewell Hall, and Brent Lewis. It began in 1984 and ceased publication in December 1999 producing 176 issues.

References

Christian magazines
Churches of Christ
Defunct magazines published in the United States
Magazines disestablished in 1999
Magazines established in 1984
Religious magazines published in the United States
Restoration Movement
Monthly magazines published in the United States